Alpha Sumoi Lansana (born October 14, 1980) is a Sierra Leonean international footballer who currently plays as a defender for Kamboi Eagles in the Sierra Leone National Premier League. Lansana is a regular member of the Sierra Leone national football team.

External links
http://www.goal.com/en/articolo.aspx?ContenutoId=120676

Living people
Sierra Leonean footballers
Association football defenders
1980 births
Ports Authority F.C. players
People from Kenema
Sierra Leone international footballers